Hemavan (South Sami: Bïerke) is a locality situated in Storuman Municipality, Västerbotten County (Lapland), Sweden with 222 inhabitants in 2010.

It is located on European route E12. During the winter months Hemavan caters to many tourists, mainly from Sweden and the neighbouring countries of Norway and Finland.

Hemavan also has the Hemavan Airport, with one flight per day 6 days of the week to and from Stockholm-Arlanda.

Hemavan is the starting point of the Kungsleden trail.

Climate
Hemavan has a subarctic climate (Köppen Dfc) with cold winters and mild summers. Due to North Atlantic low-pressure systems dominating winter months, Hemavan receives sizeable amounts of snow in winter and the cover usually thaws in May.

See also 
 Tärnaby

References

External links

Hemavan & Tärnaby

Populated places in Västerbotten County
Populated places in Storuman Municipality
Ski areas and resorts in Sweden